MRM is a global direct and digital marketing agency. MRM stands for McCann Relationship Marketing. It is part of McCann Worldgroup within The Interpublic Group of Companies (IPG), one of the Big Four marketing firms.

The agency builds customer utility, which it defines as a measurement of content and context in the service of the brand, to attract, engage, acquire and retain consumers and business decision makers. MRM’s suite of offerings includes original content creation, digital strategy, cross-media analytics, technology strategy, technology digestion, and web design.

Its best known creative work includes the design, maintenance and marketing programs for General Motors (Chevrolet.com, GMC.com, Buick.com, Cadillac.com), MasterCard (Priceless.com), the U.S. Army (GoArmy.com), Nikon (StunningNikon.com), and Microsoft (Clearification.com and others).

Based in New York City, it has been ranked among the top ten digital agencies in the world by size, according to Adweek, MediaPost, and RECMA. It has been named B2B Magazines "Direct Agency of the Year" for the three consecutive years it was eligible (2004, 2006, and 2008). In 2012, MRM received both the Crain's BtoB "Top Interactive Agency 2012" and "Top Direct Agency" honors.

History
In 1962, March Advertising & Direct Marketing was founded as an independent direct marketing agency.

In 1980, McCann Erickson acquired March Advertising and merged it with its Direct Response Division, an internal direct marketing operation formed in 1978, to form McCann-Erickson March. Shortly thereafter, the company changed its name to March Direct Marketing and then again in 1985 to McCann Direct.

In January 1997, under the leadership of Stan Rapp, who joined as head of the company in 1996, McCann Direct changed its name to McCann Relationship Marketing (MRM). This name change corresponded with the formation of McCann Worldgroup. In 2001, MRM merged with Zentropy Partners and became MRM Partners. In 2005, Reuben Hendell became CEO of MRM Partners and renamed it to MRM Worldwide.

In 2014, MRM Worldwide became MRM//McCann. The company acquired Optaros that same year.

Timeline 
 1962–1980: March Advertising & Direct Marketing
 1980–1982: McCann-Erickson March (merger of March Advertising and McCann Erickson Direct Response Division)
 1982–1985: March Direct Marketing
 1985–1997: McCann Direct
 1997–2001: McCann Relationship Marketing (MRM)
 2001–2005: MRM Partners (merger of MRM and Zentropy Partners)
 2005–2014: MRM Worldwide
 2014–2019: MRM//McCann
 2020–present: MRM

References

Companies based in New York City